Träume is the second and last studio album in German language by the French popular singer Françoise Hardy. Released only in Germany during January 1970. The record was published in no other country making it extremely rare and sought after.

Track listing 
Orchestras : Jean-Claude Petit (A1), Jean-Claude Vannier (A2-A5-B5),  Jean-Pierre Sabar (A3-A4-B4-B6), Hans Hammerschmidt (A6-B1-B2), Saint-Preux (B1) and Charles Blackwell (B3).

References 

Françoise Hardy albums
1970 albums
German-language albums